Danity Kane was an American girl group whose final line-up comprised Aubrey O'Day, Dawn Richard, and Shannon Bex. The group originally had five members, but Wanita "D. Woods" Woodgett left the group in 2008, and Aundrea Fimbres left in 2014. Formed on the third iteration of MTV's Making the Band reality television series in 2005, they signed to Bad Boy Records by Diddy.

Danity Kane's self-titled debut studio album was released in 2006 and achieved success in the United States, shipping a million copies domestically, while spawning two singles with top 10 single "Show Stopper" and the ballad "Ride for You". Their second studio album, Welcome to the Dollhouse, was released in 2008 following the release of their second top 10 single "Damaged". The band became the first female group in Billboard history to debut their first two albums at the top of the charts.

Despite initial success, tension in the group led to a meeting with Diddy where, in the October 2008 finale episode of Making the Band 4, he removed O'Day and Woodgett from the group. The three remaining members of the group carried on with previously scheduled promotional events before officially disbanding in early 2009. All group members were ultimately released from their contracts with Bad Boy Records later within the year. In 2013, four of the five group members (O'Day, Bex, Richard and Fimbres) made an official announcement regarding their reunion at the 2013 MTV Video Music Awards; however, on May 16, 2014, the first night of their reunion tour in San Francisco, Fimbres announced her departure from the group due to wanting to start her family, leaving O'Day, Bex and Richard to continue as a trio.

On August 8, 2014, after a fight in the recording studio between members O'Day and Richard, O'Day and Bex announced publicly that Danity Kane had disbanded again. Although they disbanded, their third studio album, DK3, was released in October 2014. Following the second disbandment, Richard continued to release solo music while O'Day and Bex formed the duo Dumblonde. In August 2018, the trio announced that they would reunite and tour together. O'Day and Richard released new music as a duo under Danity Kane in 2020. However, since March 2020, the group stopped posting on their official Instagram account, leaving the group on an indefinite hiatus.

History

2004–2005: Making the Band 3 

In 2004, producer Sean Combs returned with Making the Band 3, the third iteration of the Making the Band television series, in search of the next female supergroup. With the help of choreographer Laurie Ann Gibson, vocal trainer Doc Holiday and talent manager Johnny Wright, he set out on a multi-city search and invited 20 young singers out of almost 10,000 young women to live and compete for positions in the group in New York City. When seven women remained, Combs became discontent with the level of talent remaining in the competition and decided not to form a band. He did, however, feel three contestants deserved another chance, including then-best friends Aubrey O'Day and Aundrea Fimbres, whose close bond originally formed early in the season. The three contestants became the first to appear in season 2 of the show.

At the start of the second season, Combs once again pressed his team to audition new young women for the group. Finally, 20 young women were chosen and moved into a loft in New York City. Viewers had become invested in O'Day and Fimbres's friendship, naming them "the AUs" and "Aubrea" (portmanteaus of their first names), as they watched the two compete all over again for positions in the group. As the competition's challenges increased, their friendship seemed to become the foundation upon which the group was being built. In addition, O'Day emerged as the show's breakout star.

After weeks of dance and singing lessons, promotional appearances, and a performance in front of 10,000 at a Backstreet Boys concert at Nissan Pavilion in Bristow, VA, 11 contestants remained, including O'Day and Fimbres. The finalists were sent home for three months, told to polish up, and return for the final stretch in November 2005.

On the second season's finale, on Tuesday, November 15, 2005, the show's ratings broke MTV records as millions of viewers watched to see the group officially formed. Five of the 11 remaining contestants were chosen: O'Day first, Wanita "D. Woods" Woodgett second, Shannon Bex third, Dawn Richard fourth, and Fimbres last.

The third season of Making the Band 3 tracked the development and struggles of the new band — from then on known as "Danity Kane" (a name taken from a female anime superhero created and drawn by Richard). The group would later be featured on the second and third seasons of Making the Band 4 with new male R&B group Day26, as well as new solo artist Donnie Klang.

2006–2007: Danity Kane and rumors of disbandment 

After months of recording, the band's self-titled debut album was released to mixed reviews on August 22, 2006, in the United States. Produced by Timbaland, Scott Storch, Rodney Jerkins, Mario Winans and Ryan Leslie among others, the album sold over 90,000 copies in the first day of release, and over 234,000 in the first week of release. It debuted at number one on the U.S. Billboard 200 albums chart, knocking veteran Christina Aguilera's Back to Basics from the top spot and out-selling hip-hop duo OutKast. The album received a platinum certification from the RIAA in November 2006.
The album's lead single "Show Stopper", produced by Jim Jonsin, was serviced to radio on August 4, 2006, and subsequently debuted at number 17 on the Billboard Hot 100; it however peaked at number 8 on that particular chart. Outside the United States, the song became a top-30 success in Germany and Lithuania. The selection for the album's second single, the Bryan Michael Cox-produced "Ride for You", was influenced by a fan poll that was distributed through e-mails, MySpace, and the group's official web site. The music video for the song premiered on MTV's Total Request Live on December 5, 2006, the same day the band released a holiday song called "Home for Christmas", which was written by Richard.

From February to May 2007, Danity Kane performed as an opening act, along with The Pussycat Dolls, on Christina Aguilera's Back to Basics Tour. In the meantime, the band intensified work on their second album, which was initially scheduled for a late 2007 release but was eventually pushed back to 2008.

Ever since the creation of the group, Danity Kane was plagued by rumors of the group's demise, largely due to the group's reality television origins, their management, record label, and mentor. In the summer of 2007, during a hiatus between their first and second albums, speculation concerning the possibility of a disbandment by fans and the media circulated the internet and entertainment news outlets. The rumors were fueled by quotes taken out of context (most notably when Aubrey O'Day was questioned by TMZ about her relationship to the successful pop girl group the Pussycat Dolls and their television show Pussycat Dolls Present: The Search for the Next Doll) and by work the group members had done outside of Danity Kane since the release of their debut album. D. Woods's association with another girl group, The Girl's Club, was specifically cited as adding credibility to breakup rumors. Additionally, reports of solo careers and of new groups forming from various combinations of members of the group were rampant.
Over the course of these rumors, the members of Danity Kane often published personal online responses to the breakup speculation. It was not until July 25, 2007, that Danity Kane released an official statement on their group MySpace page stating that they were still together and working on their second album.

2007–2008: Welcome to the Dollhouse and departures of O'Day and Woods 

While making several solo appearances on other artists' albums during fall 2007, Danity Kane was featured on the second season of the fourth iteration of Making the Band which debuted January 28, 2008, on MTV, where solo singer Donnie Klang, Day26, and the girls, lived and recorded their albums together.
"Damaged", the band's poll-voted lead single from their second album Welcome to the Dollhouse, was officially released as a digital single on January 29, 2008, and became the band's second top ten hit on the Billboard Hot 100. Its music video was nominated for an MTV Video Music Award for "Best Pop Video" and "Best Dancing in a Video" but lost to "Piece of Me" by Britney Spears and "When I Grow Up" by the Pussycat Dolls respectively. Welcome to the Dollhouse, was eventually released on March 18, 2008, in the United States, where it debuted at number one on the Billboard 200, with first week sales of 236,000 copies (2,000 units more than their self-titled debut album). The album eventually received a gold certification from the RIAA in April 2008. On September 28, 2008, the album had sold a total of 546,790 copies. In a May 2008 interview with Kiwibox.com, Danity Kane revealed that the follow-up single to "Damaged" would be "Bad Girl".
On the second-season finale of Making the Band 4, it was announced that Danity Kane would be headlining a tour in 2008 and be featured on the next season of Making the Band, as Diddy stated himself. The third season of Making the Band 4 premiered on MTV August 19, 2008. Around a week later, the girls were featured in an interview with Z100 at the Beatstock Dance Festival, where they stated they were planning to release another single after "Bad Girl".

After Making the Band 4 – The Tour and the release of the first single "Damaged", Danity Kane once again encountered rumors of a breakup, largely spurred by scenes from the Making the Band series featuring their mentor Sean Combs sparring with O'Day over her dance performance and desire to create her own image separate from the group. On the August 28, 2008, episode of Making the Band, Combs, frustrated with the "oversexed" image he felt O'Day now showcased, he called O'Day "one of the worst dancers" in Danity Kane, when she used to be "one of the best". He told O'Day that she no longer looked like the girl he signed. Combs accused O'Day of trying to expand her fame at the expense of the entire group, and said that she liked flaunting her breasts and wearing big hair. He asked himself why he was keeping O'Day in the group. With O'Day forgoing promotional appearances with the group to appear as Amber Von Tussle on Broadway's Hairspray, speculation arose that O'Day's role in the group had been marginalized. On September 7, 2008, however, the group appeared together at the MTV Video Music Awards to help present the Best New Artist Award.

Speculation of a break-up were also developing because of rumors that Richard would perhaps be groomed to launch her own solo career with Bad Boy Records. Rumors had been circulating that Richard was flown from Baltimore to New York for private meetings with Combs to launch her own solo career, especially after recording three tracks for Combs, which were purported to be Danity Kane tracks but only featured Richard's vocals; these vocals were leaked on the Internet. Combs went as far as to introduce Richard in a solo performance in early September. An Atlantic Records spokesperson responded, "At no point was [Richard] flown anywhere to record solo or meet alone with [Combs]. The girls are still very much together. They're going out to the Video Music Awards together ... and they're promoting their album 'Welcome to the Dollhouse' and working on their third." The group intended to open for Janet Jackson's Rock Witchu Tour, but had to withdraw due to label conflicts.

In Season 3, Episode 8 of Making the Band, Combs stated that he did have Richard on three demos for his new album. On the same episode of the show, which was filmed on September 12, 2008, after continued debate with O'Day about the well-being of Danity Kane, he stated that O'Day was no longer in the group, as had been foreshadowed in an earlier episode within the season after a TRL (Total Request Live) appearance. Combs was unaware of the specific problems within the group, but sensed that O'Day and Aundrea Fimbres, who were originally close friends, had drastically drifted apart. O'Day and Richard informed Combs that the entire group had trust issues with management and ultimately each other. The season finale, which took place Tuesday, October 14, 2008, confirmed the departure of O'Day and Woods. Combs removed Woods due to feeling that she was unhappy with the group and that she had gotten "caught up in the wrath" of close friend O'Day. In the live section of the episode, Combs explained that the reason he let O'Day go was that she was not the same person he signed, that the fame had changed her (as had been expressed on the August 28, 2008, episode). "I got love for Aubrey", he said. "I don't have any beef with her. I just want to work with the young lady that I signed, not the person that fame has made her." He later stated that he would be open to working with Woods again. When O'Day came on to reply, just moments after deciding not to leave the studio, she first addressed the perception some people, especially bloggers, have of her. "I would rather be hated every damn day of my life for being real than loved for being something I'm not", she stated. Combs, who spoke to the group and the audience via satellite, relayed to O'Day, "Check this out, baby girl... See, your attitude is gonna have you in a dark and lonely place. ... What you need to do, at the end of the day, is humble yourself." Woods did not appear on the live episode due to prior obligations.
In a backstage interview before the finale, O'Day said, "Tonight is a representation of the end of a chapter in my life; it's not the end of the book." She added, "I will do everything possible to make my mark on this industry, and Danity Kane and [Combs] provided me with this amazing opportunity to go out and really touch people's hearts. I think the way that we were able to inspire people was something that I will never be able to achieve in that way again in my life."
MTV News reached out to a rep for Danity Kane to see where the future of the band stood now that [O'Day and Woods] were no longer in the group. It was reported that Woods planned to work with another group, the Girls Club, and that O'Day was working on a solo album.

In an October 15, 2008, interview with Us Weekly, Richard gave further insight into O'Day's dismissal from Danity Kane. "[Combs] did not like [O'Day's] image...where her image was going for the group", she said. "It wasn't a personal thing." Richard explained that O'Day's increasingly "sexy look" was alienating young fans. Referring specifically to O'Day's topless pictures for Complex magazine just a month before, Richard stated, "We had just did a signing with Dollhouse Teen, which is for 13, 14-year-old young girls... So we can't do that one day and then the next day do an obnoxious cover.... [Combs] wants the fans, and he says he can't do that if we can continue to go in the direction that we were going." Richard further relayed, "[Combs] told me specifically that [O'Day] is no longer in Danity Kane and Danity Kane will move forward without her." When asked if Combs would seek "replacements" for O'Day and Woods, Richard stated, "He has not said anything per that. But I think in my heart that he is gonna do another show."
MTV News gauged fan reactions to the dismissals of O'Day and Woods. Fans left impassioned, long and detailed comments on the MTV News site about their discontent regarding the decision to remove the two singers, and relayed that the remaining members were using the breakup to "score" publicity. Richard, in particular, received resentment from fans. Other fans were more upset about the breakup in general, with the sentiment that Danity Kane would lack the individuality (je ne sais quoi) and excitement that O'Day and Woods brought to the group. Despite, however, the dismissals of O'Day and Woods, other sections of the fandom were willing to give the "new Danity Kane" a chance and believed that the group would be as strong as they were before.

2008–2009: Disbandment 
In mid-2008, before the departure of O'Day and Woods, Danity Kane planned to start pre-production for their third studio album, which would have begun January 2009. In the meantime, Danity Kane released a line of denim jeans through Dollhouse. Under Russell Simmons Plastic Cash International, the decision was made to feature Danity Kane's image on Visa debit cards. The group had also been a part of a new ad campaign for PETA (People for the Ethical Treatment of Animals). Collectively, as a group, there were plans for a fragrance, clothing and makeup line. Richard had developed a comic book based on the superhero the group based its name on, which was intended for release sometime in 2009.

However, in a January 28, 2009, interview with MTV News, Richard announced that the group had split up. Richard explained that Combs had invited all the women to come back to the 2009 season of Making the Band and that only two of them, Richard and Fimbres, showed up. "It changes [our situation] completely", she said. "We have fans out there who love Danity Kane. We love Danity Kane. It's hard. We're sitting here trying to make sense of it now. It's hard. We're put in this position that we didn't ask to be in and we're being told to fix it." On the series and in an earlier interview, Bex had explicitly stated her discontent about Danity Kane being divided. "I don't know why [Bex left]", said Richard. "I think she's just happy. I don't want to even try to answer it 'cause that's not fair to her. I haven't [spoken to her] but I heard she's doing well with her husband and she got a house. I love her, but I don't know." Richard was surprised that only two members showed up for another season. "The thing about it ... I thought we were all going to come back and talk, or maybe if [O'Day] didn't come back, 'cause I don't know how [Combs] was feeling about that, if the four of us got together. I didn't know what to expect. I just know I got off the plane and found out I was the only one there and [Fimbres] came the next day."

Still in disbelief over the departures of O'Day and Woods, as well as the speculation about O'Day's sexuality and her forthcoming Playboy spread, Richard stated, "I'm still surprised at it all. I'm still trying to recover from the first fire. So I'm still confused. I still don't know. I'm just being so honest. I have no idea."

On February 25, 2009, O'Day told MTV News that she was not sure if Woods had been asked back for the new season of Making the Band, as far as she knew, but that she herself was not asked to return. "Well, I was fired and we all saw that", she said. "I'm not sure about the other girls — who was invited back or what they were asked to do — but I obviously wouldn't be invited back if I was fired."

O'Day conveyed her hope that fans continue to honor the group that "made her a star". "Danity Kane was a wonderful group, and like all things, nothing is forever", she said. "We had a great run and we were very successful. We may not have that answer for our fans, which is disappointing, but we did try, and that's more than a lot of people." O'Day said that though she is pursuing her own career as a solo artist, she would never turn down the chance to get onstage with her former bandmates. "I have so much respect for that situation, if there was ever interest in me coming back ... and making music with the girls, I would never say no to something like that", she said. "In regards to the other negativity, I really just chose not to comment", said O'Day. "I wrote a blog on my MySpace page, and if anyone wants to know how I feel, they can go there." O'Day later seemed to have more of a positive feeling about the whole situation. She stated, "After being kicked out, I learned you have to fight to stay happy, and that takes forgiveness of yourself."

Viewers were able to see the band's continued demise on the third season of Making the Band 4, which premiered on February 12, 2009. During the February 26, 2009, episode, as well as the continued season, viewers saw Richard and Fimbres eager to continue being a group together and hoping to work with Bex again. This eagerness eventually ended in the April 16, 2009, airing. Within the first five minutes of the episode, Combs told Richard and Fimbres during a meeting that he released O'Day and Woods, along with Bex, from their contracts, and would be releasing Fimbres as well. He told Richard that she will remain on the label and that if there are any future plans for a new Danity Kane, she would be the only returning member.

On April 23, 2009, viewers were expecting to see all five members of Danity Kane for the second part of the finale to find out if Danity Kane would without a doubt be removed from the Bad Boy label or if they would have a "fresh start" as Combs stated in the first part of the finale. During the finale, Fimbres did not show up. Bex explained that Fimbres did not show up because Fimbres "had been through enough" emotional turmoil with the group and wanted to stay home with family. As for herself not showing up for the 2009 season of Making the Band, Bex said that it was a "personal choice" and was nothing against the fans. Woods said that part of the reason for the group's demise was due to not having a "sound foundation" when it began (five strangers being put together and expected to be emotionally close) and that eventually led to professional and personal problems with the group. O'Day said she has forgiven being released from the group, and people who blamed her for the group's breakup. When asked if Danity Kane could be a group again, O'Day said yes. Woods and Bex said not at this time. Combs said that they need a "time out" for now, particularly to work on their solo or alternative careers, and that he will not reunite Danity Kane unless the group consists of all five original members.

On April 30, 2009, a special titled "The Rise and Fall of Danity Kane" aired on MTV. The special was an in-depth story showcasing how the group came together and broke apart. It reasoned that the breakup of friendships and new friendships built in place of old friendships (O'Day and Fimbres becoming distant; O'Day bonding more with Woods and Fimbres bonding more with Bex), as well as insecurity issues of each member, were contributing factors for the group's demise. In addition, everyone except for Bex was speculated as having been part of the blame.

2013–2014: Reunion, DK3, and second disbandment 

In May 2013, O'Day, Bex, Richard and Fimbres began talks about a possible reunion and have since then posted photos of the group in the recording studio. An announcement with regard to their reunion was made at the 2013 Video Music Awards on MTV. During the 2013 MTV VMAs pre-show, the four remaining members of Danity Kane announced that they were reuniting, returning on their own terms without Diddy. They announced that a single would be released soon titled "Rage", produced by The Stereotypes, the same producers who were responsible for Danity Kane's biggest single to date, "Damaged". Original group member D. Woods did not take part in the reunion. Although no reason was given for the absence, she has stated: "It has been brought to my attention that my former group members of Danity Kane will be reuniting and while I will not be a part of the reunion, I wish the ladies blessings and much success on their endeavors."

The band had their first performance in more than five years on September 21, 2013, at iHeartRadio Music Festival's Village in Las Vegas and performed an a cappella version of "Damaged". They confirmed in an interview that they were working with James Fauntleroy, Dem Jointz, Rodney "Darkchild" Jerkins, Timbaland, Da Internz, and The Stereotypes for the new album, which is set to be released in 2014. They had their first reunion concert in December 2013 at The House of Blues in Los Angeles after canceling a show with Chris Brown due to his arrest. In January 2014, a song titled "Bye Baby", which was also produced by the Stereotypes, was leaked online. They have been making many appearances since and have been hinting of doing another reality show along with their tour and new album. On March 15, 2014, Danity Kane performed their second concert since reuniting at Fort Cheyenne in Las Vegas, performing the leaked new track "Bye Baby", chart-topping hits, and fan favorites. On March 24, 2014, it was announced that the group would be hitting the road in May to begin their new tour entitled "No Filter". The group will be touring 13 different cities beginning in San Francisco on May 16, 2014.

On May 15, 2014, the band's first official reunion single, "Lemonade", was released on the Internet via SoundCloud. The single was produced by The Stereotypes, and features rapper Tyga over a production sampled from "Grindin'", the 2002 hit song by Clipse.
On May 16, 2014, on the first night of their #NOFilter Tour at The Fillmore in San Francisco, after performing several songs with Danity Kane, Fimbres announced that she would be leaving the group at the end of their tour, and O'Day, Bex, and Richard would be continuing on as a trio.

On May 28, 2014, "Lemonade" was released for purchase on iTunes, and on May 29, 2014, a lyric video for the song featuring three child impersonations of the trio was released to Vevo on YouTube.

On August 4, 2014, while in a Los Angeles recording studio, a fight ensued in which Richard allegedly punched O'Day. After days of speculation, O'Day and Bex released a public statement on August 8 announcing the group's second disbandment. On September 24, 2014, O'Day and Bex announced that despite the group's break-up, their third album, DK3, would be released on October 28, 2014. Following the group's break-up, Bex and O'Day began to release music under the name Dumblonde, while Richard continued to pursue her solo career.

2018–2020: Second reunion 
In August 2018, Bex, O'Day and Richard announced The Universe Is Undefeated Tour, with O'Day and Richard stating that they had made amends. The set list for the tour would be split into three parts. The first part to focus on promoting the sophomore material from Bex and O'Day's duo, Dumblonde, followed by a second part showcasing Richard's solo efforts, while the finale part would include songs by the group. In January 2019 during their tour stop in Houston and a few weeks later on Instagram, O'Day announced that Danity Kane would work on new music.

After touring for close to a year performing Danity Kane's, Dumblonde's and Richard's solo music, the trio released a new song under the Danity Kane moniker called "Neon Lights" on June 24, 2019. To promote the new single, Danity Kane had a two day interactive event, entitled "Choose Your Own Adventure", where fans decided which songs they performed for the first half of the show.

In 2020, Danity Kane released an EP entitled Strawberry Milk containing two singles: "Fly" and "Boy Down". Although the track was released under Danity Kane, the EP is also promoted as Aubrey X Dawn. On Instagram Live, O'Day addressed Bex's absence from the group. She stated "Shan is building a company right now called Vooks." O'Day said, "Danity Kane is so much bigger than five girls. It can be one girl, it can be two, it can be five. It's a voice for women and you got two of us right now giving you that voice and who knows what the future will have ahead of us. Things can evolve, things move in different directions. Everyone is always invited back." On March 19, 2020, Danity Kane released their third single as a duo entitled, "New Kings".

Discography 

Studio albums
 Danity Kane (2006)
 Welcome to the Dollhouse (2008)
 DK3 (2014)

Tours 

Headlining
 Jingle Ball Tour (2006)
 Making the Band 4 – The Tour (2008)
 #NoFilterTour (2014)
 The Universe Is Undefeated Tour (2018–19)

Supporting act
 Never Gone Tour (2005)
 The Monkey Business Tour (2006)
 Back to Basics Tour (2006–07)

Members

Awards and nominations

References

External links 

 
 Aubrey O'Day website

Participants in American reality television series
Singing talent show winners
Bad Boy Records artists
American pop music groups
American contemporary R&B musical groups
American girl groups
American pop girl groups
Musical groups established in 2005
Musical groups disestablished in 2009
Musical groups reestablished in 2013
Musical groups disestablished in 2014
Musical groups reestablished in 2018
Musical quintets